Sean Miguel Thompson, better known by his stage name Sean T, is an American rapper and record producer from East Palo Alto, California. Throughout his career both as a rapper and a producer, he has released seven solo albums, two albums with his group Murder One Gangstas and has worked with some of California's top rappers, including E-40, C-Bo, and 3X Krazy.

Biography
Sean T started his career in 1989 as a DJ before becoming a member of the rap group M.O.G. (short for Murder One Gangstas). The group released their debut album Exposed to the Game in 1992. A year later, Sean T released his first solo album, entitled Straight from the Streets. In addition to his solo work, Sean T has produced dozens of albums for various West Coast rappers and founded his own Get Gone Records label.

Discography

Studio albums
Straight from the Streets (1993)
 Pimp Lyrics & Dollar Signs (1996)
Heated (2000)
 Can I Shine? (2001)
 Familiar Ground (2002)
 Terrain Boss (2003)
 Ain't Playin' (2005)

Collaboration albums
Exposed to the Game with M.O.G. (1992)
Still Exposed with M.O.G. (2002)

Extended plays
My Testimony (2013)

References

External links
Sean T official website
Sean T on Myspace
Sean T on Facebook
Sean T on Instagram

African-American rappers
American hip hop record producers
Rappers from the San Francisco Bay Area
Year of birth missing (living people)
Living people
Gangsta rappers
People from East Palo Alto, California
21st-century American rappers
Record producers from California
21st-century African-American musicians